is a Japanese word for "the roaring of the sea".  is also a feminine Japanese given name which can also be used as a surname.

Possible writings
Narumi can be written using different kanji characters and can mean:
鳴海, "the roaring of the sea"
as a given name
成美, "achieve, beauty"
成実, "achieve, truth"
as a surname
成実, "achieve, truth"
成海, "achieve, sea"
鳴海, "the roaring of the sea"
The given name can also be written in hiragana or katakana.

People with the name

Given name 
Narumi Kakinouchi (成美, born 1962), Japanese manga artist, animator, director, and character designer
, Japanese woman murdered in France
, Japanese modern pentathlete
, Japanese women's footballer
Narumi Takahashi (成美, born 1992), Japanese pair skater
Narumi Takahira (成美, born 1989), Japanese voice actress
Narumi Tsunoda (なるみ, born 1962), Japanese voice actress
Narumi Yasuda (成美, born 1966), Japanese actress
Narumi Hidaka (奈留美, born 1968), Japanese voice actress
, Japanese AV idol

Surname 
August S. Narumi, Bronze Wolf recipient
Kyoko Narumi (鳴海 杏子, born 1986 ), Japanese voice actress
Riko Narumi (成海, born 1992), Japanese actress and model
Takeshi Narumi (鳴海), a Japanese novelist and scriptwriter

Fictional characters

Given name 
Narumi (鳴海), a character from the manga and anime series Alice Academy
Narumi Yatadera, a character from the Touhou Project

Surname 
Ayumu Narumi (鳴海), the main character in the manga and anime series Spiral: The Bonds of Reasoning
Kiyotaka Narumi (鳴海), the brother of Ayumu Narumi from the manga and anime series Spiral: The Bonds of Reasoning
Kiyotaka Narumi (成実), a character in the anime series Lucky Star
Shogo Narumi (鳴海), a character in the manga series Beauty Pop
Shizuto Narumi (成海), a minor character in the manga and anime series Yakitate!! Japan
Yui Narumi (成実), a character in the anime series Lucky Star
Shōhei Narumi (鳴海), a character in the video games Devil Summoner: Raidou Kuzunoha vs. the Soulless Army and Devil Summoner 2: Raidou Kuzunoha vs. King Abaddon
Akiko Narumi (鳴海), the lead female character of Kamen Rider W
Soukichi Narumi (鳴海), Akiko's father and former boss of one of the lead characters in Kamen Rider W 
Daisuke Narumi, a character in the Kuroko no Basuke

See also
Narumi-juku (鳴海宿), the fortieth of the fifty-three stations of the Tōkaidō
Narumi Station (鳴海駅), a train station located in Nagoya

Japanese feminine given names
Japanese-language surnames